William Hay may refer to:

 William Hay (died 1664) (1594–1664), English politician who sat in the House of Commons variously between 1641 and 1660
 William Hay (architect) (1818–1888), Scottish architect
 William Hay (Australian politician) (1816–1908)
 William Hay (author) (1875–1945), Australian author and essayist
 William Hay (bishop) (1647–1707), Scottish bishop
 William Hay (Seaford MP) (1695–1755), British Member of Parliament for Seaford, 1734–1755
 William Hay (police commissioner) (1794–1855), Joint Commissioner of the London Metropolitan Police, 1850–1855
 William Hay, 10th Marquess of Tweeddale (1826–1911), British politician, Member of Parliament for Taunton and Haddington
 William Hay, 11th Marquess of Tweeddale (1884–1967), Scottish aristocrat, land owner and soldier
 Willie Hay, Baron Hay of Ballyore (born 1950), Northern Irish peer and former Member of the Northern Ireland Assembly
 William Hay, 1st Earl of Erroll (1423–1462), Scottish peer
 William Hay, 4th Earl of Kinnoull (died 1677), Scottish peer
 William Hay, 6th Earl of Kinnoull (died 1709), Scottish peer
 William Hay, 15th Earl of Kinnoull (1935–2013), peer, surveyor and farmer
 William Hay, 3rd Earl of Erroll (1449–1507), Scottish peer
 William Hay, 4th Earl of Erroll (1449–1513), Scottish peer and soldier
 William Hay, 5th Earl of Erroll (1495–1522), Scottish peer and statesman
 William Hay, 6th Earl of Erroll (1521–1541), Scottish peer
 William Hay, 10th Earl of Erroll (1590s–1636), Scottish nobleman
 William Hay, 17th Earl of Erroll (1772–1819), Scottish peer
 William Hay, 18th Earl of Erroll (1801–1846), Scottish peer
 William Hay, 19th Earl of Erroll (1823–1891), Scottish peer
 William Hay, 6th Lord Hay of Yester (died 1591), Scottish nobleman and courtier
 William Hay (English cricketer) (1849–1925), English cricketer
 William Arthur Hay (1873–1945), Australian clergyman and cricketer
 William Howard Hay (1866–1940), American doctor, author, lecturer and conceiver of the food combining diet
 William Perry Hay (1872–1947), American zoologist
 William Robert Hay (1761–1839), British barrister, cleric and magistrate
 Rupert Hay (William Rupert Hay, 1893–1962), British Indian Army officer and administrator in British India
 William Delisle Hay (1853–?), British author
 William H. Hay (1860–1946), United States Army officer
 William Walter Hay (1908–1998), American civil engineer and University of Illinois professor of railway engineering
 William W. Hay (1934–2022), geologist and paleoclimatologist with the University of Colorado

See also
 Bill Hay (born 1935), Canadian ice hockey player
 Bill Hay (radio announcer) (1887–1978), American radio announcer
 Bill Hay (field hockey) (born 1934), Singaporean Olympic hockey player
 Bill Hay (footballer) (1934–2018), Australian footballer
 Will Hay (1888–1949), English comedian and actor
 William Haye (1948–2019), Jamaican cricketer
 William Hay Macnaghten (1793–1841), Anglo-Indian civil servant
 William Hays (disambiguation)
 William Hayes (disambiguation)